James Edward Monaghan (20 September 1921 – July 2007) was an Australian politician. Born in Sydney, he attended Catholic schools and then the University of Sydney. He was a public servant and barrister before entering politics. In 1961, he was elected to the Australian House of Representatives as the Labor member for Evans, defeating the sitting Liberal member, Frederick Osborne. He held the seat until 1963, when he was defeated by Liberal Malcolm Mackay. Monaghan returned to law after leaving politics.

References

Australian Labor Party members of the Parliament of Australia
Members of the Australian House of Representatives for Evans
Members of the Australian House of Representatives
1921 births
2007 deaths
20th-century Australian politicians